"Someday You'll Want Me to Want You" is a popular song published in 1944 by Jimmie Hodges. The song became a standard, recorded by many pop and country music singers.

Background
In April 1951, Hugh O. Starr, an inventor from Steubenville, Ohio, filed an action in United States District Court, Southern District of New York, against Jimmie Hodges and publisher Duchess Music Corporation. Starr alleged that he wrote the words and music to 'Someday' in 1944, after which the defendants "appropriated, copyrighted, published and sold" his work. He was awarded $15000 in a settlement.

Charting versions
Elton Britt's 1946 version peaked at number 2 on the Most Played Juke Box Folk Records chart.
The recording by Vaughn Monroe was released by RCA Victor Records as catalog number 20-3510 (78rpm) and 47–2986. It first reached the Billboard Best Seller chart on July 29, 1949, and lasted eighteen weeks on the chart, spending two weeks at  number 1.
The recording by The Mills Brothers was released by Decca Records as catalog number 24694. It first reached the Billboard magazine Best Seller chart on August 12, 1949, and lasted 15 weeks on the chart, peaking at number 8.
A version by Jodie Sands barely made the Top 100 chart in 1958, reaching number 95, but did better in the United Kingdom, where it spent 10 weeks on the charts, peaking at number 14.
Ricky Nelson released a version in 1958 which reached number 9 in the UK, and number 3 in Norway.
Singer Della Reese released a rendition of the song in 1960, and it peaked at number 56 on the Billboard Hot 100 chart, and number 31 on Cash Box magazine's best-selling chart.
American country artist Patsy Cline posthumously released a single version of the song, which reached number 23 on the Bubbling Under Hot 100 chart in 1964.

Other recorded versions

Nolan Strong and The Diablos, 1961
Ken Dodd, 1976
Eddy Arnold, 1954
Gene Autry, 1946
Brook Benton, 1960
Issy Bonn, 1946
Tanya Rae Brown, 1999
Ray Charles, 1962
Sam Cooke, 1958
Norrie Cox & His New Orleans Stompers
Hank Crawford, 1968
Vic Damone, 1958
Ronnie Dove, 1966
Clyde McPhatter & The Drifters, 1954
Maureen Evans, 1958
Connie Francis, 1962
Don Gibson, 1968
Jim Hendricks
Hoosier Hot Shots
Bunk Johnson
George Jones, 1965
Tom Jones, 1966
Kitty Kallen, 1961
Steve Kuhn
Lester Lanin
Brenda Lee, 1962
Jerry Lee Lewis, 1987
Warner Mack, 1962
Mando & The Chili Peppers
Dean Martin, 1960
Emile Martyn Band
Mina, 1972
Vaughn Monroe, 1949
Anne Murray, 2002
Willie Nelson, 1993
Daniel O'Donnell, 1994
Les Paul and Mary Ford, 1962
Gene Pitney, 1965
The Ravens, 1949
Jim Reeves, 1959
Cliff Richard with The Shadows, 1965
The Rim Rock Ramblers
Tex Ritter
Jimmy Roselli, 1971
Cynthia Sayer, 2000
Sonny & Cher, 1971
Red Steagall, 1976
Swingville All-Stars
Justin Tubb, 1957
Gene Vincent and The Shouts, 1964
Bobby Vinton, 1966
Yotam Perel
The Ames Brothers with Hugo Winterhalter & His Orchestra, 1959
Mark Wynter, 1965
Rolando Becerra
The Emmons Sisters

References

1944 songs
1945 singles
1949 singles
Elton Britt songs
Gene Autry songs
Patsy Cline songs
Ricky Nelson songs
Vaughn Monroe songs